The economy of Turkmenistan continues to recover from the 2014 downturn in hydrocarbon prices, but remains "in the grip of its worst economic crisis since the immediate post-independence period, driven in part by low gas prices, the suspension of gas exports to Russia between 2016 and 2019...and poor harvests." Former President Gurbanguly Berdimuhamedow at a session of the Cabinet of Ministers on March 11, 2021, called the rate of GDP growth unsatisfactory. When discussing the 2021 government budget, he noted that 2021 would be "as difficult" a year as 2020 had been.
According to the 2020 Investment Climate Statement of the US Department of State, Turkmenistan's economy depends heavily on the production and export of natural gas, oil, petrochemicals and, to a lesser degree, cotton, wheat, and textiles.  The economy is still recovering from a deep recession that followed the late 2014 collapse in global energy prices.  The current investment climate is considered high risk for US foreign direct investment.

Turkmenistan is largely a desert country with intensive agriculture in irrigated areas, and huge gas and oil resources. In terms of natural gas reserves, as of 2020 it is ranked 4th in the world. Turkmenistan's two largest agricultural crops are cotton, most of which is produced for export, and wheat, most of which is domestically consumed. Turkmenistan is among the top ten producers of cotton in the world.

History 
From 1998 to 2005, Turkmenistan suffered from a lack of adequate export routes for natural gas and from obligations on extensive short-term external debt. At the same time, however, total exports rose by an average of roughly 15% per year from 2003 to 2008, largely because of higher international oil and gas prices. As in the Soviet era, central planning and state control pervade the system, and the Niyazov government (in power 1991–2006) consistently rejected market reform programs. The state subsidized a wide variety of commodities and services from the early 1990s to 2019. Following his election in 2007, President Gurbanguly Berdimuhamedow unified the country's dual currency exchange rate, ordered the redenomination of the manat, reduced state subsidies for gasoline, and initiated development of a special tourism zone (Awaza) on the Caspian Sea.

Since 2009, Turkmenistan has maintained a fixed exchange rate. In that year, the rate was set at US$1 to 2.85 manats.  On January 1, 2015, the official exchange rate was changed to US$1 to 3.50 manats. However, the black-market exchange rate as of February 2021 was fluctuating around 29 to 30 manats to the dollar. As of mid-April, the black-market manat-dollar exchange rate had slid to 40 manat to the dollar.

Fiscal policy
The government budget is developed and implemented in accord with the Law “On Budget System”. The law fixes the legal foundations of organizing management and operating the budget system, and regulates interrelations between budgets at all levels. The government of Turkmenistan discusses the state budget draft and submits it to the President of Turkmenistan. One month prior to the beginning of the fiscal year the President of Turkmenistan submits to the Assembly of Turkmenistan (Mejlis) the state budget draft for consideration and adoption. The Ministry of Economy and Finance is responsible for state finances.

Budget statistics are unreliable because the government spends large amounts of extra-budgetary funds. The 2021 budget of the Turkmenistan government totals 79.5 billion manats of revenue, down from 84.39 billion manats in 2020, and 103.57 billion manats in 2017.  The 2021 expenditure budget was set at 72.1 billion manats.

The Central Bank of Turkmenistan controls the issue of money, but does not publish data on the money supply.

The Central Bank promotes cashless transactions.  In the January–April period of 2020, the volume of cashless transactions using debit cards slightly more than tripled compared to the same period in 2019, to just under 1.9 billion manat. This shift from cash to electronic payments was not without problems; shortages of cash in automatic teller machines and inadequate availability of card payment facilities at points of sale were reported.

At least one non-governmental organization has openly called the economy of Turkmenistan a kleptocracy.

Industry
In the post-Soviet era, Turkmenistan's industrial sector has been dominated increasingly by the fuel and cotton processing industries to the detriment of light industry. Between 1991 and 2004, some 14 new cotton-processing plants were opened, sharply increasing the capability of processing domestically produced cotton. The construction industry depends mainly on government building projects because construction of private housing is a low priority.

Natural gas
See also Turkmenistan / Natural gas and export routes

Turkmenistan's natural gas reserves are estimated at 50 trillion cubic meters.

Turkmenistan's major gas deposits were discovered in its central and eastern areas in the 1940s and 1950s, and in the 1980s the republic became the second largest producer of gas in the Soviet Union, behind the Russian SFSR. During the Soviet era gas was exported mainly to other Soviet republics, as Turkmenistan steadily increased delivery from about 9.2 million m³ in 1940 to about 234 million m³ in 1960 and about 51 billion m³ in 1975. This export was under centralised control, and most of the export revenue was absorbed into the Soviet central budget.

This changed in 1991, when Turkmenistan gained independence and established full control over gas export and export revenues. However, Soviet-era pipelines dictated that much of the gas go to the Caucasus, Russia and Ukraine. In the 1990s many of Turkmenistan's gas customers in the CIS failed to pay on time or negotiated barter deals. In the mid-1990s Turkmenistan stopped delivering gas to some CIS members, citing failure to pay and unprofitable barter deals. At the same time, the government tried to attract investments in building gas pipelines via Iran to Turkey and Western Europe via Afghanistan to Pakistan. Neither deal went through due to an unfavourable regional security environment and high costs; inflation and the budget deficit rose but privatisation was resisted.

In the late 1990s the government renegotiated its export and price arrangements with Gazprom and renewed deliveries to Georgia, Ukraine, and some other countries. It also opened its first pipeline not to pass through Russia, the Korpezhe-Kurt Kui Pipeline.

On December 14, 2009, the Central Asia–China gas pipeline was opened, and Turkmenistan began delivering large volumes of natural gas to the China National Petroleum Corporation. Combined design capacity of Lines A, B, and C of this pipeline system is 55 billion cubic meters per annum (bcma), of which Turkmenistan's quota is 35 bcma. By 2015 Turkmenistan was delivering approximately 35 bcma to China, counterbalancing declining exports to Russia, which ended on January 1, 2016.  Russia had earlier restricted its imports to about 10 bcma, and then 5 bcma. Russian purchases resumed, albeit in smaller quantities, in 2019.

Small-volume sales of an estimated 12 bcma to Iran halted on January 1, 2017, when Turkmenistan unilaterally cut off supplies over payment arrears. Ashgabat claimed Tehran owed some $1.8 billion for supplies delivered nearly 10 years before.

In January–November 2020, Turkmenistan extracted 62.3 billion m3 of natural gas, of which, according to one source, it exported 31 billion.

One observes in the table below that production and exports peaked in 2008 and dramatically decreased in 2009. This was due an explosion in the Central Asia–Center gas pipeline system in April 2009 for which Turkmenistan blamed Gazprom. Natural gas exports include pipeline gas directly to China and Russia, and to Azerbaijan via a swap with Iran, plus liquid petroleum gas shipped by rail and truck to Afghanistan.

In February 2022, Turkmenistan was identified as an ultra-emitter of methane by the European Space Agency's satellite-based TROPOspheric Monitoring Instrument, with the value of lost methane equalling about US$6 billion per year.

Natural gas to gasoline production
On June 28, 2019, a US$1.7 billion factory for producing gasoline out of natural gas was commissioned in Ovadandepe.  Built by Rönesans and Kawasaki using technology from Haldor Topsoe, the factory has a design capacity of 600,000 tonnes of gasoline, 12,000 tonnes of diesel fuel, and 115,000 tonnes of liquefied petroleum gas per year, produced from 1.7 billion cubic meters of natural gas. According to opposition media, as of January 2023 the plant had halted production of export-grade ECO-93 gasoline due to a lack of catalyzers, and was producing only lower-quality gasoline for domestic consumption.

Oil
See also Turkmenistan / Oil

Turkmenistan's major oil-producing area is in the west, mainly in Balkan Province, and is part of the South Caspian Basin, an intercontinental depression noted for oil production. Commercial oil production on the Turkmen side of the Caspian Sea began in the early 1900s, in the environs of the Cheleken Peninsula, and modern oil drilling began in the 1930s near Balkanabat. The Gumdag field was developed in 1949, then Goturdepe (1958), Ekerem (1962), and others.  Offshore drilling began in the 1970s.

Major onshore oil fields include Çeleken, Goñurdepe, Nebitdag, Gumdag, Barsagelmez, Guýujyk. Gyzylgum, Ördekli, Gögerendag, Gamyşlyja, Ekerem, Çekişler, Keýmir, Ekizek, and Bugdaýly. In 2019, capital investment in the oil industry totalled 3.29 billion manats. In January–November 2020, Turkmenistan extracted 8.7 million tonnes of oil and condensate. Production of liquid petroleum gas totalled 231,000 tonnes.

The oil production and consumption data in the table below are taken from BP Statistical Review.

Petroleum refining

Oil is processed at two refineries, the Türkmenbaşy and Seydi oil refining complexes.   The Turkmenbashy oil refinery had a refining capacity of more than 10 million tons of oil per year as of May 2016. The refinery produces a range of products, including unleaded gasoline, petroleum coke, asphalt, laundry detergent, hydro-treated Diesel, and lubricating oil.  The Turkmenbashy oil refinery is Turkmenistan's largest producer of liquid petroleum gas, accounting for two-thirds of total production with annual output of about 300 thousand tonnes.

The Seydi refinery processed about 135,500 tonnes of oil in the first quarter of 2020, and 441,200 tonnes January–November, implying capacity of about half a million tonnes of oil in 2020 despite design capacity of 6 million tonnes. In the first eight months of 2021, the Seydi refinery produced 135,200 tonnes of gasoline, 77,600 tonnes of diesel fuel, 22,800 tonnes of heavy gas oil, and 19,500 tonnes of asphalt. The Seydi refinery was built during the Soviet period to process oil from Siberia. Since the collapse of the Soviet Union, however, the Seydi refinery has been supplied with hydrocarbons from Turkmenistan, including the Gokdumalak, Yashyldepe, Yoloten, and Kerwen fields.

In October 2020, President Gurbanguly Berdimuhamedow criticized low output from refineries, stating, "...growth is not observed in oil extraction, half of which is exported. Processing enterprises do not operate at the appropriate level, and for a long time are used at barely 40%."

Natural gas and oil exports 
Based on Chinese and Turkmen official trade data, China is the major importer of Turkmenistan's natural gas, with historical volumes between 32 and 35 billion cubic meters per annum (bcma). Thirty-five bcma is Turkmenistan's quota on the Central Asia–China gas pipeline. Turkmen media reported that in 2022 China imported 43.2 bcm of natural gas via that pipeline, but did not specify how much of that originated in Turkmenistan.

Smaller volumes of pipeline gas are also bought by Russia's Gazprom, with 4 bcm in 2019, 4.7 bcm in 2020, and approximately 10 bcm in 2021. Some of this gas is sold onward to Uzbekistan. In June 2019 Russia and Turkmenistan signed a five-year agreement for annual deliveries of 5.5 bcm.

In November 2021, the governments of Turkmenistan, Iran, and Azerbaijan announced agreement on a natural gas swap of up to 2 billion cubic meters per year, with Turkmen gas to flow to Iran, and Iranian gas to flow to Azerbaijan. Iran's oil minister, Javad Owji, declared readiness to increase the swap volume to 15 bcma. Chinese sources reported that in 2021 Turkmenistan earned $6.79 billion for delivering natural gas to China. Chinese Customs statistics show China imported natural gas from Turkmenistan from January through November 2022 valued at $9.28 billion.

According to BP's Statistical Review of World Energy 2021, Turkmenistan's natural gas exports in 2020, by destination, in billion cubic meters were:

In June 2021 Turkmenistan and China announced award of a tender to CNPC Chuanging Drilling Engineering Company, Ltd. for drilling gas wells in the Galkynysh gas field in return for payment in kind of 17 bcm of natural gas delivered over a period of three years. The first of these wells was commissioned in January 2023.

Power generation
See also Turkmenistan / Energy

In 2019, total electrical energy generation in Turkmenistan reportedly totalled 22,521.6 million kilowatt-hours (22.52 terawatt-hours).

As of 2013, Turkmenistan had 10 electrical power plants equipped with 32 turbines, including 14 steam-driven, 15 gas powered, and 3 hydroelectric.  Power output in 2011 was 18.27 billion kWh, of which 2.5 billion kWh was exported.  The Asian Development Bank reported in October 2018,Turkmenenergo, the State Energy Corporation is the vertically integrated power utility in
the country. In 2017, it produced more than 23 TWh of electricity, exporting 15% of that to neighboring countries.

New power plants have been constructed in Mary, Ahal province, and in Çärjew District of Lebap province. The Mary-3 combined cycle power plant, built by Çalık Holding with GE turbines, commissioned in 2018, produces 1.574 gigawatts of electrical power and is specifically intended to support expanded exports of electricity to Afghanistan and Pakistan. The Zerger power plant built by Sumitomo, Mitsubishi, Hitachi, and Rönesans Holding in Çärjew District has a design capacity of 432 megawatts from three 144-megawatt gas turbines and was commissioned in September 2021. It is also primarily intended for export of electricity. The Zerger plant uses natural gas from the Üçajy Gas Field, delivered via a 125-km high-pressure pipeline. The Ahal power plant, with capacity of 650 megawatts, was constructed to power the city of Ashgabat and in particular the Olympic Village. The Derweze State Electrical Power Station, a 504.4 megawatt power plant built by Çalık Enerji in 2015, is located near Ovadandepe. In March 2023, the government announced plans to build a 1,574-megawatt natural gas-fired power plant in Balkan Province.

A "national grid strengthening project" with support from the Asian Development Bank is underway, which will build four new power substations and add direct high-voltage lines, a 500-kilovolt line between Balkan province and Dashoguz, and a 200-kilovolt line between Buzmeyin and Balkanabat.  The intention is to create an "interconnected national transmission grid to improve reliability and energy efficiency..."

Minerals
The following table is from Mineral Industry of Turkmenistan published by the United States Geological Survey, an agency of the US government, and is thus in the public domain.

In January 2023 the deputy prime minister for industry and construction reported discovery of iron oxide deposits near Çagyl, Türkmenbaşy District, Balkan Province.

Construction materials
Four cement plants operate in Turkmenistan, and plans have been announced to construct three more. The four cement plants currently in operation, each designed to produce one million tons per year, are:
 Baherden Cement Plant (Ahal Province)
 Kelete Cement Plant (Ahal Province)
 Lebap Cement Plant (in Türkmenabat)
 Balkan Cement Plant (in Jebel)

In 2019, President Berdimuhamedov noted that the Kelete plant was operating at 8.1%, the Lebap plant at 88%, the Baherden plant at 64%, and the Balkan plant at just over 40% of design capacity.

In 2019, Turkmenistan produced 5.1 million standard square meters (4mm thickness) of sheet glass. A $375 million float glass and glass container plant built by Tepe Inşaat of Turkey was opened February 14, 2018, in Ovadandepe north of Ashgabat. It replaced a Soviet-era glass factory located in central Ashgabat.  In 2019, the value of Turkmenistan's glass exports as reported by trading partners was US$9.5 million.

A steel smelter, Türkmen Demir Önümleri Döwlet Kärhanasy operating on scrap metal is located at kilometer 22 on the Ashgabat-Dashoguz Automobile Highway near Ovadandepe.  It produces mainly rebar and channel iron.

Chemicals
As of 2019, Turkmenistan had "nine chemical plants that produce nitrogen and phosphorus fertilizers (700,000 tons per year), sulfuric and nitric acids, iodine, bromine, and mineral salts."

In 2019, the country was the world's 3rd largest producer of iodine.

Petrochemicals
Three plants in Turkmenistan produce urea (carbamide), primarily intended for export, one each in Tejen, Mary,and Garabogaz.  The $1.3 billion Garabogaz plant, built by Mitsubishi Heavy Industries and GAP İnşaat (a subsidiary of Çalık Holding), was inaugurated on September 18, 2018, with a design capacity of 1.16 million tonnes of urea per year. The US$650 million Mary ammonia and urea plant, commissioned on October 17, 2014, was built by Rönesans Holding, Kawasaki, and Sojitz with design capacity of 400 thousand tonnes of ammonia and 640 thousand tonnes of urea. The $240 million Tejen plant, inaugurated on March 18, 2005, has a design capacity of 350,000 tonnes of urea per year.  Reportedly, none of these plants currently produces at full capacity, however.  Between January and October 2019, the Garabogaz plant produced approximately 392,000 tonnes of urea, of which 261,000 tonnes was exported.  Production of nitrogenous fertilizers in Turkmenistan totalled 550,500 tonnes (active ingredient basis) in 2019.

The Kiyanly Polymer Factory, inaugurated October 17, 2018, features design capacity to produce 381 thousand tonnes of polyethylene and 81 thousand tonnes of polypropylene per year.  Built at a cost of US$3.4 billion by LG International, Hyundai Engineering, Toyo Engineering, and Gap Inşaat, the plant cracks methane and ethane for production of polymers.  In the first ten months of 2019, however, the factory produced only 67,900 tonnes of polyethylene and 12,700 tonnes of polypropylene. As of January 2023, the polymer plant had reportedly ceased operation.

Non-hydrocarbon chemicals
In March 2017 the Garlyk Mining and Enrichment Combinate for production of potash fertilizer was inaugurated.  Built by Belarus's Belgorkhimprom at a cost of US$1.1 billion, the factory is designed to produce 1.4 million tonnes of fertilizer per year, primarily for export to China and India.  It reportedly operates at from 2 to 7 percent of rated capacity, however.

Three factories produce iodine in Turkmenistan, one each in Balkanabat, Hazar, and Bereket.  The Bereket plant is designed to produce 150 tonnes per year of iodine.  Following planned renovations and upgrades, the Balkanabat and Hazar plants will have design capacities of 250 tonnes and 300 tonnes of iodine, respectively, plus 2400 tonnes and 4500 tonnes of bromine, respectively, per year.  Total production of iodine in 2019 was 681.4 tonnes.

Textiles and Garments
As a cotton producer, from its conquest by the Russian Empire in the 1880s until independence in 1991 Turkmenistan mainly exported raw cotton to Russia for spinning. Since independence, Turkmenistan has invested roughly $2 billion in 70 plants and factories for production of cotton yarn, textiles, and garments made from other materials, including shoes. Of these, 13 are large ginning, spinning, or textile mills.  In 2019, Turkmenistan exported cotton textiles worth $123.6 million. In 2019, Turkmenistan produced 118,600 tonnes of cotton yarn, and 209.4 million square meters of fabric, of which 192.9 million was cotton, 14.9 million was terrycloth, and 1.4 million was silk. In addition, Turkmenistan produced in 2019 40.9 million pairs of stockings, 5.5 million knit items, 1.5 million pairs of shoes, and 3,400 tonnes of knitted fabric.

Construction
The Turkmenistan government centrally funds and controls major construction projects.  As of January 2021, the government acknowledged over 2,500 large-scale projects under construction at a cost of $37 billion.  In 2020, about two million square meters of new residential housing was built at government expense, as well as 45 "important government" structures. In 2021 construction was completed of five major facilities in Ashgabat (a new State Tribune, the Arkadag Hotel, two bank headquarters, and a new Congress Center, all by Bouygues). Total cost of these five projects was $1.5 billion.

A current major project is the $1.5 billion being spent on construction of the city of Arkadag, the new capital of Ahal province. In addition, $2.3 billion has been allocated for construction of the Ashgabat-Turkmenabat motorway by a consortium of four Turkmen construction firms.

Services

Transport

As a crossroads for centuries and part of the Silk Road, Turkmenistan serves as a transit point for cargoes shipped by air, sea, and land. Under normal conditions, Ashgabat International Airport is a stopover and transfer point for air passengers between India (Amritsar and New Delhi) and England (London and Birmingham), as well as between Frankfurt-am-Main and Bangkok.

Seaports

Turkmenistan's major seaport is the Turkmenbashy International Seaport on the Caspian.  Expanded at a cost of $2 billion between 2013 and 2018 by Gap Inşaat, the seaport has capacity to handle annually 25 million tonnes of dry cargo (17 million in the newly expanded port, 8 million in the old port), 300,000 passengers, 75,000 freight trucks, and 400,000 containers. The port features regular ferry service to Baku.  This seaport also manages three oil loading terminals, Kenar, Alaja, and Ekerem. Turkmenistan's only other seaports are the loading terminals for factories at Kiyanly (Gyýanly) and Garabogaz and an oil loading terminal at Hazar.

Airports

Five major airports in Turkmenistan feature regular domestic passenger service: Ashgabat, Dashoguz, Mary, Turkmenabat, and Turkmenbashy.  A sixth international-class airport at Kerki was commissioned in June 2021 and was slated to begin regular domestic passenger service in January 2022. A seventh airport, Balkanabat, is in operation for special flights.  Under normal conditions, only Ashgabat International Airport offers regular international passenger service. Turkmenbashy International Airport is used for international cargo, chiefly by Cargolux.  The lone domestic air carrier is state-owned Türkmen Howa Ýollary (Turkmenistan Airlines).  In 2019, Turkmenistan Airlines hauled 12 thousand tonnes of cargo. It also flew 2.5 million passengers and 2.98 billion passenger-kilometers.

Minor airports are found in some smaller cities and towns, including Balkanabat, Etrek, Garabogaz, Hazar, and Jebel in Balkan Province. A former military airfield at Galaýmor in Mary Province is slated for conversion to civil aviation.  There are also small landing strips at Aeroport village and Gäwers in Ahal Province.

Rail

The domestic rail system is operated by state-owned Türkmendemirýollary (Turkmen Railways).  No scheduled international passenger service exists, but domestic passenger service connects major Turkmen cities.  Freight service is available to both domestic and international destinations.  In 2019, 23.8 million tonnes of freight was transported by rail in Turkmenistan. In the same year, Turkmen Railways handled 5.44 million passengers and counted 2.53 billion passenger-kilometers.

Roads

As of 2011, Turkmenistan featured 13.7 thousand kilometers of roads, of which 12.3 thousand were paved.  In 2019, road transport accounted for 27.1 billion passenger-kilometers, or 83% of passenger traffic in Turkmenistan.  Motor vehicles transported 
448.9 million tonnes of cargo in 2019, 85.5% of the total, and accounted for 14.2 billion tonne-kilometers.  Major highways in Turkmenistan include the M37 connecting the seaport at Türkmenbaşy to the border with Uzbekistan at Farap, the Ashgabat-Dashoguz Highway connecting Ashgabat and Dashoguz, and the P-7 highway connecting the M37 at Tejen to the border with Iran at Sarahs.

Banking
The financial system is under full state control. The banking system, which was reduced substantially after the 1998 financial crisis, includes 9 national banks.  These include a nominally private bank owned by the Union of Industrialists and Entrepreneurs, Rysgal Bank, and Turkmen-Turkish Bank, a joint venture between Dayhan Bank and Turkish state-owned Ziraat Bankası. These institutions have the same basic division of responsibility as in the Soviet era, overseen by the Central Bank of Turkmenistan. Lending operations and household savings have not been important functions of this system. In 2005 an estimated 95 percent of loans went to state enterprises.  Two branches of foreign banks, National Bank of Pakistan and Iran Saderat Bank, are located in Ashgabat, where they offer retail banking services.  Two German banks, Deutsche Bank and Commerzbank, offer institutional services through offices in Ashgabat.

As of January 1, 2021, total assets of all banks in Turkmenistan amounted to 135.8 billion manats.  Deposits by individuals totalled 3.3 billion manats, including 2.8 billion in demand deposits and 437 million manats in time deposits. Business deposits totalled 39.1 billion manats, of which 14.6 billion in demand deposits and 53.7 billion in time deposits.  Total business deposits were broken out into state-owned firms (32.5 billion manats), privately owned firms (21.1 billion manats), and individual unincorporated entrepreneurs (7.9 billion manats).

In 2019, 84.1 billion manats worth of credit was extended to individuals, firms, and organizations, up from 76.3 billion in 2018 and 69.2 billion in 2017.  Of these figures, 60.9 billion, 52.1 billion, and 46.7 billion were in Turkmen manats, respectively.

Turkmengosstrakh, the state insurance firm, has a complete monopoly of the very small insurance industry.

Tourism

Agriculture

In 2019, Turkmenistan produced:

 1.5 million tons of wheat;
 582 thousand tons of cotton;
 356 thousand tons of tomato;
 315 thousand tons of potato;
 263 thousand tons of watermelon;
 246 thousand tons of grape;
 245 thousand tons of sugar beet, which is used to produce sugar and ethanol;
 130 thousand tons of rice;
 74 thousand tons of onion;
 71 thousand tons of carrot;
 66 thousand tons of apple;
 34 thousand tons of apricot;

in addition to other agricultural products.

In the early 2000s, the contribution of Turkmenistan's state-run agriculture sector to gross domestic product increased under close state supervision. The top crop in terms of area planted is wheat (761 thousand hectares in 2019), followed by cotton (551 thousand hectares in 2019). In recent years state policy makers have increased the range of crops with the aim of making Turkmenistan self-sufficient in food. In the post-Soviet era, the area planted to grains (mainly wheat) has nearly tripled. However, most agricultural land is of poor quality and requires irrigation. Turkmenistan's irrigation infrastructure and water-use policies have not responded efficiently to this need. Irrigation in areas distant from natural rivers depends mainly on the decrepit Karakum Canal, which carries water across Turkmenistan from the Amu Darya to near Bereket. The Dostluk Dam, opened at Sarahs on the border with Iran in 2005, has increased available irrigation water and improved efficiency. Plans call for a similar dam on the Atrek River.

During the 2020 season, Turkmenistan reportedly produced roughly 1.5 million tons of raw cotton. Prior to imposition of a ban on export of raw cotton in October 2018, Turkmenistan exported raw cotton to Russia, Iran, South Korea, United Kingdom, China, Indonesia, Turkey, Ukraine, Singapore and the Baltic states.  Beginning in 2019, the Turkmenistan government shifted focus to export of cotton yarn and finished textiles and garments.

Private farmers grow most of Turkmenistan's fruits and vegetables (chiefly tomatoes, watermelons, grapes, and onions), but all production phases of the main cash crops—grain and cotton—remain under state control. In 2006 grain crop failures led to steadily increasing bread lines and reinstatement of a rationing system in most regions. At the root of those failures was a culture of falsifying output figures together with poor administration of the sector.

Since 2018, independent media have reported food shortages in the country, with hundreds of people queuing for hours to buy bread and flour. Despite official government figures indicating good harvests, independent media report low output due to drought and mismanagement, and that shortages of flour and bread have reappeared.

Mechanization of agriculture
Since independence, the Turkmenistan government has spent considerable sums on imported agricultural tractors, harvesters, and implements.  In 2012, around 7,000 tractors, 5,000 cotton cultivators, 2,200 seeders, and other machines, mainly procured from Belarus and the United States, were used.

John Deere and Case IH each began selling farm machinery in Turkmenistan in 1994. Claas combines were first used for grain harvesting in Turkmenistan in 2011. Belarus tractors, in use since Soviet times, continue to be popular due to competitive pricing and deep familiarity with the product line.  Turkmenistan also buys cotton harvesters from Uzbekistan.

Between 2017 and 2020 Claas delivered 1,000 Tucano 420 grain combines, 800 Axion 850 plowing tractors, and 1,550 Axos 340 tractors.  In the 2017 and 2018 crop years John Deere delivered 440 Model 9970 cotton harvesters, and between 2019 and 2020 another 600.

Trade
The following table presents the value of Turkmenistan's exports and imports in millions of US dollars, by year, from 2015 through 2019.

Turkmenistan's most important export commodity is natural gas, delivered by pipelines to China and in lesser quantities to Russia and via a swap through Iran to Azerbaijan, and by road and rail to Afghanistan as liquid petroleum gas.  According to Chinese Customs data, the value of Chinese imports of natural gas from Turkmenistan fell from US$8,686,022,768 in 2019 to US$6,071,165,273 in 2020 due to a combination of reduced Chinese import volumes and falling hydrocarbon prices.  Crude oil and refined petroleum products accounted for another US$3 billion of exports in 2019, followed by US$123.6 million for cotton textiles.  Among imports, major categories in 2019 were machinery (US$1.5 billion), base metals (US$968.3 million), chemicals (US$682.3 million), vehicles (US$453.5 million), and plastic and rubber and products thereof (US$342.9 million).

In March 2023 the Turkmenistan parliament passed a law adopting the Harmonized System of tariff nomenclature.

Labour

In 2019, Turkmenistan counted 666,500 employees of large- and medium enterprises, and 103,900 employees of non-state (private, mixed public-private, or foreign) enterprises.  The structure of employment was 25.3% in the state sector, 50.3% in the private sector, 22.0% mixed public-private enterprises, 0.2% in public associations, 0.4% in cooperatives, and 1.8% in foreign-owned enterprises, including joint ventures. According to official statistics, in 2019 77,474 individuals were employed by individual entrepreneurs, including self employment.

Major sectors for employment were:

43.5% in agriculture
9.8% in manufacturing
8.4% in education
7.4% in trade and vehicle repair
5.8% in construction
4.3% in transport and storage
3.6% in health and social work
2.9% in arts, entertainment

The average monthly wage in 2019 was 1,685.10 manats per month, up from 943.40 in 2012 and 507 in 2007.

In 2004 the labour force was estimated to include more than 2.3 million workers, 48.2 percent of whom worked in agriculture, 37.8 percent in services, and 14 percent in industry and construction. Because the state dominates the economy, an estimated 90 percent of workers are in reality effectively state employees. It is believed that downsizing the government workforce, which began in 2003, increased unemployment in subsequent years. Unemployment in 2014 was estimated at 11%. In recent years, due to the economic downturn linked to falling hydrocarbon prices, unemployment is estimated to be as high as 60 percent, despite official figures of less than four percent.

Privatization
According to official statistics, between 1994 and the end of 2020, 2,628 former state-owned properties had been privatized.

The breakout by type of enterprise privatized was:
845 wholesale and retail trade, vehicle repair
143 manufacturing
108 real estate operations
95 agriculture, forestry, fisheries
51 transportation and storage
27 construction
18 hospitality industry
1,341 other services

In March 2021, President Berdimuhamedow ordered conversion of Derýaýollary Production Association, a subordinate unit of the State Service of Maritime and River Transportation of Turkmenistan (Türkmendeňizderýaýollary) state agency responsible for river and canal transport, into an open joint-stock company.

All land remains property of the government, as during the Soviet era.

Macro-economic trends
The following table shows the main official economic indicators in 1993–2020 as provided by the Turkmenistan government to the International Monetary Fund. 

The accuracy of GDP figures has been called into doubt by the Asian Development Bank, which in 2006 noted, "According to official statistics, the economy continued to grow rapidly in 2005, but actual growth was likely much lower than the official estimate. Government has overstated growth in the past." The UK government's Overseas Business Risk report for 2021 notes, "No reliable economic data are published in Turkmenistan. Most sources cite figures which the government releases to the international financial institutions. These do not always square with observation on the ground."  Outside observers have also expressed skepticism about the official figures for the rate of inflation. In the June 2021 Global Economic Prospects report, the World Bank excluded Turkmenistan "[d]ue to lack of reliable data of adequate quality".

At a session of the Cabinet of Ministers on March 11, 2021, government officials revealed that in "recent years" Turkmenistan had borrowed over US$14 billion in foreign exchange loans from foreign creditors, of which US$5 billion remained outstanding as of March 8, 2021. However, a chart shown on television indicated debt in 2021 of US$1.3524 billion. Opposition media seized on this figure to estimate GDP of US$12.3 billion based on a statement by Central Bank Chairman Rahimberdi Jepbarov that external debt equals 11% of GDP.

In June 2021, official state media reported that debts to China for construction of natural gas pipelines had been paid in full.

Miscellaneous statistics

Exchange rates prior to 2009

During the early years of independence, the official exchange rate of the Turkmen manat to the US dollar grew dramatically.  At the same time, the black-market exchange rate grew even faster, eventually hovering around 24,000 to 25,000 manats to the dollar.

Notes

External links

 Turkmenistan: Potential 'Super-Giant' Emerges On Energy Scene